Russula herrerae is an edible mushroom in the genus Russula. Described as new to science in 2002, it is found only in its type locality in Mexico, where it grows in temperate oak forests near the village of San Francisco Temezontla in the state of Tlaxcala. The specific epithet herrerae honors Mexican mycologist Teófilo Herrera. R. herrerae is classified in the section Plorantes, subsection Lactarioideae.

Description
The cap margin is appendiculate, meaning that there are patches of the partial veil attached to it. The brittle white gills have an adnate to decurrent attachment to the stem and are distantly spaced, with many lamellulae (short gills) interspersed between them. The color of the spore print ranges from white to pale cream.

The mushrooms are considered edible by most inhabitants of San Francisco Temezontla, who call it hongo blanco (white mushroom) or hongo blanco de ocote (pine white mushroom).

See also
List of Russula species

References

External links

herrerae
Edible fungi
Fungi described in 2002
Fungi of Mexico
Fungi without expected TNC conservation status